Gemmobacter tilapiae is a Gram-negative, rod-shaped, aerobic and non-motile bacterium from the genus of Gemmobacter which has been isolated from a freshwater pond in Taiwan.

References

External links
Type strain of Gemmobacter tilapiae at BacDive -  the Bacterial Diversity Metadatabase

Rhodobacteraceae
Bacteria described in 2013